Kutluma or 'Qatlama' is a Pakistani savory dish. It is served around the world in top Pakistani restaurants. It is made with dough mixed with chili powder, garam masala and red food coloring. Small balls of this dough are sprinkled with mash dal (washed  urad dal), coriander and anar dana, rolled out and then deep fried in oil. Sometimes, the qatlama before frying is also covered with chickpea flour paste called 'besan' in Urdu.
In many places in Pakistan, Qatlama has a yeast based dough and is topped with spiced minced beef or lamb. This version of Qatlama is quite different then the vegetarian version described earlier which is primarily served in the eastern city of Lahore.

References

Pakistani cuisine
Pakistani fast food